Telioneura rosada is a moth in the subfamily Arctiinae. It was described by Paul Dognin in 1895. It appears as a pink-tinged brown moth, with a set of wings and a pair of long antennae. It is found in Ecuador.

References

Natural History Museum Lepidoptera generic names catalog

Arctiinae